Petekli can refer to:

 Petekli, Demirözü
 Petekli, İspir